Mutau is a village in the north eastern part of Namibia in the Caprivi region. It is situated along the Linyanti road. The name Mutau means "big lion". mutau played a big role in the community wellbeing. Mutau was one of the few settler to arrive in the caprivi region.

Populated places in the Zambezi Region